Gregory Andrew DeLong (born April 3, 1973) is a former American football tight end in the National Football League.

Early life and education
DeLong was born in Orefield, Pennsylvania. He attended Parkland High School in South Whitehall Township, Pennsylvania and then the University of North Carolina, where he played football for the North Carolina Tarheels.

NFL career
DeLong went undrafted in 1995 but was signed by the Minnesota Vikings as an undrafted free agent that year and played with the Vikings from 1995 until 1998. He played for the Baltimore Ravens in 1999 and the Jacksonville Jaguars in 2000.

References

1973 births
Living people
American football tight ends
Parkland High School (Pennsylvania) alumni
North Carolina Tar Heels football players
Minnesota Vikings players
Baltimore Ravens players
Jacksonville Jaguars players
Sportspeople from Lehigh County, Pennsylvania